Shenzhen Special Zone Daily,  also known as Shenzhen Tequ Bao or Shenzhen Special Zone Post or Shenzhen Special Economic Zone News or Shenzhen SEZ News, is a simplified Chinese newspaper published in the People's Republic of China. 

The newspaper, launched on May 24, 1982, is the organ newspaper of the Shenzhen Municipal Committee of the Chinese Communist Party.

History
Shenzhen Special Zone Daily was inaugurated on May 24, 1982, and it is the first special zone newspaper in China.

On March 26, 1992, Shenzhen Special Zone Daily first published a long-form newsletter entitled "The East Wind Brings Spring all Around : An On-the-Spot Report on Comrade Deng Xiaoping in Shenzhen" (东方风来满眼春——邓小平同志在深圳纪实). This report had a tremendous impact on Chinese society as a whole,  and is a landmark article in the history of China's Reform and opening up.

References

Newspapers published in Asia
Publications established in 1982
Daily newspapers published in China
Chinese-language newspapers (Simplified Chinese)